La Chapelle is a commune in the Saint-Marc Arrondissement, in the Artibonite department of Haiti. It has around 50,000 inhabitants as of 2018.

References

Populated places in Artibonite (department)
Communes of Haiti